Ctenochaetus, or bristletooth tangs, is a genus of fish in the family Acanthuridae.

Species
There are currently nine recognized species in this genus:
 Ctenochaetus binotatus J. E. Randall, 1955 (Twospot surgeonfish)
 Ctenochaetus cyanocheilus J. E. Randall & Clements, 2001
 Ctenochaetus flavicauda Fowler, 1938
 Ctenochaetus hawaiiensis J. E. Randall, 1955 (Chevron tang) 
 Ctenochaetus marginatus (Valenciennes, 1835) (Striped-fin surgeonfish)
 Ctenochaetus striatus (Quoy & Gaimard, 1825) (Striated surgeonfish)
 Ctenochaetus strigosus (E. T. Bennett, 1828) (Kole Tang)
 Ctenochaetus tominiensis J. E. Randall, 1955 (Tomini surgeonfish)
 Ctenochaetus truncatus J. E. Randall & Clements, 2001

References

Acanthuridae
Marine fish genera
Taxa named by Theodore Gill